Orla Tinsley is a journalist, campaigner and multimedia artist from County Kildare in Ireland.

Work 
Tinsley began writing for The Irish Times on the state of cystic fibrosis care in Ireland in 2005 when they were 18. Their work launched a decade long campaign to improve healthcare services and awareness of cystic fibrosis in Ireland. The campaign spanned several years and became a nationwide community effort sustained by Tinsley's articles in The Irish Times about lack of facilities, the deaths of their friends and the stories and energy of people with CF and their families and communities around Ireland.

When Tinsley was 10 they returned to school after a prolonged hospitalization into a lesson on Seamus Heaney's poem Mid-Term Break. They have cited this poem as having a profound effect on helping them understand death in a way that could not be communicated otherwise. They began writing poetry. Two years later they won the Holy Family Secondary School Junior Poetry Cup and joined Kildare Youth Theatre.

In September 2008, for their work they were named Rehab Young Person of the Year In April 2009, they appeared on Late Late Show after writing several pieces in The Irish Times holding government to account on broken promises to build an adult cystic fibrosis unit in Dublin.
In 2009, they began an internship in The Irish Times. That same year the promised government funding for the cystic fibrosis unit was pulled and the campaign reprised. Several campaigners from the previous had died. Tinsley and other new campaigners featured on RTE Liveline Show which played an important role in the campaign. Tinsley was named Irish Tatler Magazine's Woman of the Year  in 2009. In 2010, they were awarded the Young Medical Journalist of the Year award.

Tinsley features in an Irish documentary Orla Tinsley: Warrior, which follows the process of their double lung transplant in New York in 2018. In 2020 the film was nominated as a finalist in the New York Festivals TV and Film Awards.

Producer and writer 
In April 2011 Tinsley presented, co-wrote and researched a special documentary for RTÉ's flagship current affairs programme Prime Time to apply pressure for building to begin at St Vincent's Hospital in Dublin.

In June 2011, an extract from Tinsley's book Salty Baby appeared on the Junior Cert exams. In 2015, extracts form Tinsley's non-fiction book Salty Baby were included in an English Junior Cert curriculum book.

In September 2018, Tinsley co-produced a documentary about their transplant for RTE Television and in the following ten days over 9,000 people registered to be organ donors in Ireland. The organization that promotes organ donation awareness in Ireland said the response said "The public's interest  in organ donation has dramatically spiked since cf campaigner Orla Tinsley's documentary was aired... such a level of public interest has not been seen for almost a decade" The Irish Broadcaster RTE coined the response "The Tinsley Effect" because of the strong and policy changing work Tinsley consistently creates.

Author 
In September 2011, their best-selling memoir Salty Baby : A memoir was published by Hachette. The Sunday Times described the book as "gonzo journalism". It was shortlisted for Best Newcomer at the Bórd Gáis Irish Book Awards.

Siobhán Parkinson, the first Laureate na nÓg in Ireland, was inspired to write her book Miraculous Miranda after hearing Tinsley on the radio.

The Adult Cystic Fibrosis Unit Campaign 
The idea of an Adult Cystic Fibrosis practice was conceived at St. Vincent's Hospital in the late 1970s by Professor MX Fitzgerald. CF was one of the first conditions to be treated by a multidisciplinary team comprising doctors, dietitians, physiotherapists, psychologists and nurse specialists but there was no adult treatment centre that had dedicated isolation rooms for people with CF. Huge improvements in life expectancy were achieved in this period but when advances in microbial genetics revealed how highly-resistant and life-threatening bacteria could spread through the CF patient population, it became clear that a dedicated space was vital to treat CF patients in isolation from one another. Tinsley first wrote about the need for a dedicated CF centre in The Irish Times when they were 18 and the words they wrote and subsequent interviews and writing over the next decade drove awareness to a new level.

In July 2012, after campaign work over numerous years, a dedicated Cystic Fibrosis Unit opened. The ward block has an outpatient and inpatient facility for people with cystic fibrosis. It also has a floor of isolation rooms for people with cancer and another floor for those with infectious diseases who need isolation.

Similar units have opened in Cork University Hospital and University Hospital Limerick.

Transgender rights 
Tinsley identifies as queer, non-binary. In 2012 and 2013, Tinsley focused on the rights of transgender people to attain gender recognition in Ireland. They were named Broadcaster / Journalist of the Year by the Gay and Lesbian Association in 2013.

New cystic fibrosis drug 
In late 2012, they launched a campaign to get Kalydeco into Ireland after experts rejected making the drug available because it was too expensive. The drug is the first to treat the cause of cystic fibrosis and not just the symptoms.
In February 2013 the Minister for Health announced that the drug would be made available.

Since late 2013, Tinsley is one of the first people in the world to be treated by the second new cystic fibrosis drug lumacaftor/ivacaftor which treats the most common mutation of CF. The drug has proven to improve lung function and health for people with CF.

Columbia University 
In 2014, Tinsley announced on the Irish talk-show Saturday Night with Miriam that they had been awarded a scholarship to Columbia University.
They now live in New York City.

Double lung transplant
Tinsley received a double lung transplant in December 2017.

In November 2018, Tinsley was awarded the PR Institute of Ireland's highest honor for excellence in storytelling given only five other times in the institutes 60-year history. Other recipients include Peace Prize recipient John Hume, Special Olympics co-founder Mary Davis and Irish broadcaster Gay Byrne.

Awards and honours
 Rehab Young Person of the Year (2008)
 Youth Work Ireland Outstanding Contribution Award (2008)
 Irish Tatler Magazine Woman of the Year (2009)
 Kildare Person of the Year (2009)
 Junior Chamber International (2009)
 Armark Healthcare Award for Excellence in Advocacy(2010)
 Young Medical Journalist of the Year (2010)
 Best Newcomer at the Irish Book Awards (2011 shortlisted)
 National Newspapers Ireland Young Journalist of the Year (2011 shortlisted)
 Healthcare Person of the Year, Irish Healthcare Centre Awards(2013)
 Broadcaster / Journalist of the Year Gay and Lesbian Association Award (2013)
 Trailblazer 30 Under 30 Award (U magazine 2017)
 In November 2018, Tinsley was awarded the PR Institute of Ireland's highest honor for excellence in storytelling given only five other times in the institutes 60-year history. Other recipients include Peace Prize recipient John Hume, Special Olympics co-founder Mary Davis and Irish broadcaster Gay Byrne.
 Kildare's All time Greatest Person 2019 REVEALED: The winner of Kildare's All Time Greats is...

References

1987 births
Activist journalists
Columbia University people
Cystic fibrosis
Irish journalists
Irish women journalists
Irish memoirists
The Irish Times people
Journalists from New York City
Irish LGBT rights activists
Irish women activists
Living people
Medical journalists
Lung transplant recipients
People from County Kildare
Transgender rights activists
Irish women memoirists
Irish health activists
Women civil rights activists